Robber baron is a derogatory term of social criticism originally applied to certain wealthy and powerful 19th-century American businessmen. The term appeared as early as the August 1870 issue of The Atlantic Monthly magazine. By the late 19th century, the term was typically applied to businessmen who purportedly used exploitative practices to amass their wealth. These practices included exerting control over natural resources, influencing high levels of government, paying subsistence wages, squashing competition by acquiring their competitors to create monopolies and raise prices, and schemes to sell stock at inflated prices to unsuspecting investors.  The term combines the sense of criminal ("robber") and illegitimate aristocracy (a baron is an illegitimate role in a republic).

Usage
The term robber baron derives from the Raubritter (robber knights), the medieval German lords who charged nominally illegal tolls (unauthorized by the Holy Roman Emperor) on the primitive roads crossing their lands  or larger tolls along the Rhine river.

The metaphor appeared as early as February 9, 1859, when The New York Times used it to characterize the business practices of Cornelius Vanderbilt. Historian T.J. Stiles says the metaphor "conjures up visions of titanic monopolists who crushed competitors, rigged markets, and corrupted government. In their greed and power, legend has it, they held sway over a helpless democracy." Hostile cartoonists might dress the offenders in royal garb to underscore the offense against democracy.

The first such usage was against Vanderbilt, for taking money from high-priced, government-subsidized shippers, in order to not compete on their routes. Political cronies had been granted special shipping routes by the state, but told legislators their costs were so high that they needed to charge high prices and still receive extra money from the taxpayers as funding. Vanderbilt's private shipping company began running the same routes, charging a fraction of the price, making a large profit without taxpayer subsidy. The state-funded shippers then began paying Vanderbilt money to not ship on their route. A critic of this tactic drew a political comic depicting Vanderbilt as a feudal robber baron extracting a toll.

In his 1934 book The Robber Barons: The Great American Capitalists 1861-1901, Matthew Josephson argued that the industrialists who were called robber barons have a complicated legacy in the history of American economic and social life. In the book's original foreword, he claims the robber barons: "more or less knowingly played the leading roles in an age of industrial revolution. Even their quarrels, intrigues and misadventures (too often treated as merely diverting or picturesque) are part of the mechanism of our history. Under their hands the renovation of our economic life proceeded relentlessly : large-scale production replaced the scattered, decentralized mode of production ; industrial enterprises became more concentrated, more “efficient” technically, and essentially “coöperative,” where they had been purely individualistic and lamentably wasteful. But all this revolutionizing effort is branded with the motive of private gain on the part of the new captains of industry. To organize and exploit the resources of a nation upon a gigantic scale, to regiment its farmers and workers into harmonious corps of producers, and to do this only in the name of an uncontrolled appetite for private profit—here surely is the great inherent contradiction whence so much disaster, outrage and misery has flowed.

Charles R. Geisst says, "in a Darwinist age, Vanderbilt developed a reputation as a plunderer who took no prisoners." Hal Bridges said that the term represented the idea that "business leaders in the United States from about 1865 to 1900 were, on the whole, a set of avaricious rascals who habitually cheated  and robbed investors and consumers, corrupted government, fought  ruthlessly among themselves, and in general carried on predatory activities comparable to those of the robber barons of medieval Europe."

Criticism

Historian Richard White argues that the builders of the transcontinental railroads have attracted a great deal of attention but the interpretations are contradictory: at first very hostile and then very favorable. At first, White says, they were depicted as:

1860s–1920s
Historian John Tipple examined the writings of the 50 most influential analysts who used the robber baron model in the 1865–1914 period. He argued:The originators of the Robber Baron concept were not the injured, the poor, the faddists, the jealous, or a dispossessed elite, but rather a frustrated group of observers led at last by protracted years of harsh depression to believe that the American dream of abundant prosperity for all was a hopeless myth. ... Thus the creation of the Robber Baron stereotype seems to have been the product of an impulsive popular attempt to explain the shift in the structure of American society in terms of the obvious. Rather than make the effort to understand the intricate processes of change, most critics appeared to slip into the easy vulgarizations of the "devil-view" of history which ingenuously assumes that all human misfortunes can be traced to the machinations of an easily located set of villains—in this case, the big businessmen of America. This assumption was clearly implicit in almost all of the criticism of the period.

1930s–1970s 
American historian Matthew Josephson further popularized the term during the Great Depression in his book, published in 1934. Josephson's view was that, like the medieval German princes, American big businessmen had amassed huge fortunes immorally, unethically, and unjustly. This theme was popular during the Great Depression of the 1930s, when the public often expressed scorn for big business. Historian Steve Fraser notes that the mood was sharply hostile toward big business:Biographies of Mellon, Carnegie and Rockefeller were often laced with moral censure, warning that "tories of industry" were a threat to democracy and that parasitism, aristocratic pretension and tyranny are an inevitable consequence of concentrated wealth, whether accumulated dynastically or more impersonally by faceless corporations. This scholarship, and the cultural persuasion of which it was an expression, drew on a deeply rooted feeling that was partly religious and partly egalitarian and democratic, a sensibility stretching back to William Jennings Bryan, Andrew Jackson, and Tom Paine.  However, contrary opinions by academic historians began to appear as the Depression ended. Business historian Allan Nevins advanced the "Industrial Statesman" thesis in his John D. Rockefeller: The Heroic Age of American Enterprise (2 vols., 1940), arguing that while Rockefeller engaged in unethical and illegal business practices, he also helped to bring order to the industrial chaos of the day. According to Nevins, it was Gilded Age capitalists who, by imposing order and stability on competitive business, made the United States the foremost economy by the 20th century.

In 1958 Bridges reported that, "The most vehement and persistent controversy in business history has been that waged by the critics and defenders of the "robber baron" concept of the American businessman."  Richard White, historian of the transcontinental railroads, stated in 2011 he has no use for the concept, which has been killed off by historians Robert Wiebe and Alfred Chandler. He notes that "Much of the modern history of corporations is a reaction against the Robber Barons and fictions."

Recent approaches
In the popular culture the metaphor continues.  In 1975 the student body of Stanford University voted to use "Robber Barons" as the nickname for their sports teams. However, school administrators disallowed it, saying it was disrespectful to the school's founder, Leland Stanford.

In academe, the education division of the National Endowment for the Humanities has prepared a lesson plan for schools asking whether "robber baron" or "captain of industry" is the better terminology. They state:In this lesson, you and your students will attempt to establish a distinction between robber barons and captains of industry. Students will uncover some of the less honorable deeds as well as the shrewd business moves and highly charitable acts of the great industrialists and financiers. It has been argued that only because such people were able to amass great amounts of capital could our country become the world's greatest industrial power. Some of the actions of these men, which could only happen in a period of economic laissez faire, resulted in poor conditions for workers, but in the end, may also have enabled our present day standard of living.This debate about the morality of certain business practices has continued in the popular culture, as in the performances in Europe in 2012 by  Bruce Springsteen, who sang about bankers as "greedy thieves" and "robber barons".  During the Occupy Wall Street protests of 2011, the term was used by Vermont Senator Bernie Sanders in his attacks on Wall Street.

The metaphor has also been used to characterize Russian businessmen allied to Vladimir Putin.

The leaders of Big Tech companies have all been described as being modern-day robber barons, particularly Jeff Bezos because of his influence on his newspaper, The Washington Post. Their rising wealth and power stands in contrast with the shrinking middle class.

In contrast, Burton W. Folsom argues that the robber barons were either political entrepreneurs (who lobby government for subsidies and monopoly rights), or market entrepreneurs (who innovate and reduce costs to provide the best good or service at the lowest price). Political entrepreneurs do long-term harm to the economy with their monopolies and subsidies. This provides politicians with a pretext to insist that increased planning and increased regulation is the appropriate remedy.

List of businessmen labelled as robber barons

The people here are listed in Josephson, Robber Barons or in the cited source.

 John Jacob Astor (real estate, fur) – New York
 Andrew Carnegie (steel) – Pittsburgh and New York
 William A. Clark (copper) – Butte, Montana
 Jay Cooke (finance) – Philadelphia
 Charles Crocker (railroads) – California
 Daniel Drew (finance) – New York
 Jeff Bezos (technology, retail) - Washington
 James Buchanan Duke (tobacco, electric power) – Durham, North Carolina
 James Dunsmuir (coal, lumber) – Victoria, BC Canada
 Marshall Field (retail) – Chicago
 James Fisk (finance) – New York
 Henry Morrison Flagler (Standard Oil, railroads) – New York and Florida
 Henry Clay Frick (steel) – Pittsburgh and New York
 John Warne Gates (barbed wire, oil) – Texas
 Jay Gould (railroads) – New York
 E. H. Harriman (railroads) – New York
 William Randolph Hearst (media mogul) – California
 James J. Hill (fuel, coal, steamboats, railroads) – St Paul, Minnesota
 Charles T. Hinde (railroads, water transport, shipping, hotels) – Illinois, Missouri, Kentucky, California
 Mark Hopkins Jr. (railroads) – California
 Collis Potter Huntington (railroads) – California
 Andrew Mellon (finance, oil) – Pittsburgh
 J. P. Morgan (finance, industrial consolidation) – New York
 Elon Musk (technology, automotive industry) - California
 John C. Osgood (coal mining, iron) – Colorado
 Henry B. Plant (railroads) – Florida
 John D. Rockefeller (Standard Oil) – Cleveland, Ohio
 Henry Huttleston Rogers (Standard Oil; copper), New York
 A. S. W. Rosenbach (antique bookdealer) – Philadelphia
 Thomas Fortune Ryan (public transit, tobacco) – New York
 Russell Sage (finance, railroads) – New York
 Charles M. Schwab (steel) – Pittsburgh and New York
 Joseph Seligman (banking) – New York
 John D. Spreckels (water transport, railroads, sugar) – California
 Leland Stanford (railroads) – California
 Cornelius Vanderbilt (water transport, railroads) – New York
 Peter Widener (public transportation) – Philadelphia, Pennsylvania
 Charles Tyson Yerkes (street railroads) – Chicago

See also
 Business magnate
 Business oligarch
 Media proprietor

References

Further reading
 Beatty, Jack. (2008). Age of Betrayal: The Triumph of Money in America, 1865–1900 Vintage Books. 
 Bridges, Hal. (1958) "The Robber Baron Concept in American History" Business History Review (1958) 32#1 pp. 1–13 in JSTOR
 Burlingame, D.F. Ed. (2004). Philanthropy in America: A comprehensive historical encyclopaedia (3 vol. ABC Clio).
 Cochran, Thomas C. (1949) "The Legend of the Robber Barons." Explorations in Economic History 1#5 (1949) online.
 Fraser, Steve. (2015). The Age of Acquiescence: The Life and Death of American Resistance to Organized Wealth and Power Little, Brown and Company. 
 Harvey, Charles, et al. "Andrew Carnegie and the foundations of contemporary entrepreneurial philanthropy." Business History 53.3 (2011): 425–450. online
 Jones, Peter d'A. ed. (1968). The Robber Barons Revisited (1968) excerpts from primary and secondary sources.
 Marinetto, M. (1999). "The historical development of business philanthropy: Social responsibility in the new corporate economy" Business History 41#4, 1–20.
 Ostrower, F. (1995). Why the wealthy give: The culture of elite philanthropy (Princeton UP).
 Ostrower, F. (2002). Trustees of culture: Power, wealth and status on elite arts boards (U of Chicago: Press).
 Josephson, Matthew. (1934). The Robber Barons: The Great American Capitalists, 1861–1901 
 
 Wren, D.A. (1983) "American business philanthropy and higher education in the nineteenth century" Business History Review.  57#3 321–346. 
 Zinn, Howard. (2005). "Chapter 11: Robber Barons and Rebels" from A People's History of the United States Harper Perennial.

External links

Full Show: The New Robber Barons. Moyers & Company. December 19, 2014. Interview with historian Steve Fraser
Industrial Age in America: Robber Barons or Captains of Industry EDSITEment lesson from National Endowment for the Humanities
Robber Barons, Oil, and Power from 1860 - Daniel Sheehan, University of California Santa Cruz, "The Trajectory of Justice in America 2019, Class #5"
 college-level lectures on Robber Barons

1870s neologisms
Business terms

19th century in the United States
Industrial history of the United States
Social class in the United States
Class-related slurs